Monroe is a city in east central Butler and west central Warren counties in the southwestern part of the U.S. state of Ohio. The population was 15,412 at the 2020 census. Monroe is a part of the Cincinnati metropolitan area.

History
Monroe was laid out in 1817 on the Dayton and Cincinnati pike. The city is named for President James Monroe, fifth President of the United States.

In the early 1830s, Monroe contained one store and 119 inhabitants.

Geography
Monroe is located at  (39.444658, −84.364044).

Demographics

2010 census
As of the census of 2010, there were 12,442 people, 4,649 households, and 3,481 families living in the city. The racial makeup of the city was 92.6% White, 3.7% African American, 0.2% Native American, 1.7% Asian, 0.7% from other races, and 1.3% from two or more races. Hispanic or Latino of any race were 1.8% of the population.

There were 4,649 households, of which 39.2% had children under the age of 18 living with them, 61.6% were married couples living together, 8.8% had a female householder with no husband present, 4.5% had a male householder with no wife present, and 25.1% were non-families. 21.3% of all households were made up of individuals, and 10.1% had someone living alone who was 65 years of age or older. The average household size was 2.63 and the average family size was 3.07.

The median age in the city was 36.9 years. 27% of residents were under the age of 18; 5.9% were between the ages of 18 and 24; 29.7% were from 25 to 44; 23.1% were from 45 to 64; and 14.3% were 65 years of age or older. The gender makeup of the city was 48.8% male and 51.2% female.

2000 census
As of the census of 2000, there were 7,133 people, 2,685 households, and 2,040 families living in the city. The population density was 459.9 people per square mile (177.6/km2). There were 2,822 housing units at an average density of 182.0 per square mile (70.3/km2). The racial makeup of the city was 97.15% White, 1.42% African American, 0.10% Native American, 0.34% Asian, 0.22% from other races, and 0.77% from two or more races. Hispanic or Latino of any race were 0.64% of the population.

There were 2,685 households, out of which 32.4% had children under the age of 18 living with them, 65.1% were married couples living together, 6.9% had a female householder with no husband present, and 24.0% were non-families. 20.3% of all households were made up of individuals, and 9.3% had someone living alone who was 65 years of age or older. The average household size was 2.52 and the average family size was 2.91.

In the city the population was spread out, with 22.8% under the age of 18, 6.5% from 18 to 24, 29.1% from 25 to 44, 22.6% from 45 to 64, and 19.0% who were 65 years of age or older. The median age was 40 years. For every 100 females, there were 91.7 males. For every 100 females age 18 and over, there were 88.3 males.

The median income for a household in the city was $56,012, and the median income for a family was $62,528. Males had a median income of $44,864 versus $27,385 for females. The per capita income for the city was $24,735. About 1.0% of families and 1.9% of the population were below the poverty line, including 0.4% of those under age 18 and 2.1% of those age 65 or over.

Schools and utilities
Most of the city is in the Monroe Local School District with some falling in the Lakota School District. Telephone service is provided through the Monroe, Middletown, and Mason exchanges. Mail is delivered through the Monroe, Middletown, and Lebanon post offices. There is both a police station and a fire station on Main St. as well as the fire headquarters on Rt. 4.

Tourism
 Lux Mundi statue, located at the former site of the King of Kings statue (also known as "Touchdown Jesus" and "Big Butter Jesus") which was struck by lightning in 2010 and destroyed by fire.

Notable people
 Chase Crawford, actor and producer

References

 Jim Blount. The 1900s: 100 Years In the History of Butler County, Ohio. Hamilton, Ohio: Past Present Press, 2000.
 Butler County Engineer's Office. Butler County Official Transportation Map, 2003. Fairfield Township, Butler County, Ohio: The Office, 2003.
  A History and Biographical Cyclopaedia of Butler County, Ohio with Illustrations and Sketches of Its Representative Men and Pioneers. Cincinnati, Ohio: Western Biographical Publishing Company, 1882.
 Ohio Secretary of State. The Ohio municipal and township roster, 2002–2003. Columbus, Ohio: The Secretary, 2003.
 Marcia McCartt. "Images of America; Monroe." Arcadia Publishing, 2009.

External links
 
 Main Street Monroe
 Monroe Observer
 History of Monroe
 Monroe Historical Society
 45050 Watch

Cities in Ohio
Cities in Butler County, Ohio
Cities in Warren County, Ohio
1817 establishments in Ohio
Populated places established in 1817